The 1955 Ohio Bobcats football team was an American football team that represented Ohio University in the Mid-American Conference (MAC) during the 1955 college football season. In their eighth season under head coach Carroll Widdoes, the Bobcats compiled a 5–4 record (3–3 against MAC opponents), finished in fourth place in the MAC, and outscored all opponents by a combined total of 166 to 134.  They played their home games in Peden Stadium in Athens, Ohio.

Schedule

References

Ohio
Ohio Bobcats football seasons
Ohio Bobcats football